The MG39 Rh was a general-purpose machine gun of German origin.

It originated from a draft specification and contest held for an MG 34 Einheitsmaschinengewehr replacement that was better suited for mass production. Three companies were asked in February 1937 to submit new designs: Metall und Lackierwarenfabrik Johannes Großfuß AG of Döbeln, Rheinmetall-Borsig AG of Sömmerda, and Stübgen AG of Erfurt. The designs and mock-up guns proposals were submitted in October 1937. Großfuß AG's entry proved to be the best design to simplify and rationalize the technical concept of the MG 34, employing a unique recoil-operated roller locking mechanism whereas the two competing entries used a gas-actuated system.

Rheinmetall-Borsig further developed their entry  under the direction of Louis Stange to the MG 39 Rh, but no records of a further development request by the German military to do this are known.
The MG 39 Rh did not progress beyond the prototype stage. The only surviving example is at the Military Historical Institute of Prague in Czech Republic.

See also
List of World War II firearms of Germany

References

External links
 
 

7.92×57mm Mauser machine guns
General-purpose machine guns
Machine guns of Germany
World War II infantry weapons of Germany
Trial and research firearms of Germany
Rheinmetall